The Hope Six Demolition Project is the ninth studio album by English singer-songwriter and musician PJ Harvey, released on 15 April 2016 on Island Records. The album is Harvey's first since her acclaimed Mercury Prize-winning album Let England Shake, released in 2011.

The record's demo collection was released on March 11, 2022 to conclude Harvey's chronological re-release campaign of vinyl reissues  and demo session offerings beginning in 2020.

At the 59th Annual Grammy Awards, the album was nominated for Best Alternative Music Album, her fourth nomination in that category and seventh nomination overall.

The album's title is a reference to the HOPE VI projects in the United States, "where run-down public housing in areas with high crime rates has been demolished to make room for better housing, but with the effect that many previous residents could no longer afford to live there, leading to claims of social cleansing". The HOPE VI program is directly referenced in the album's opening track and second single, "The Community of Hope". The title is inspired by Harvey's trip to Washington D.C. with photographer/filmmaker Seamus Murphy where she was given a tour by Paul Schwartzman of The Washington Post, who directly influenced some of the lyrics on the song. Upon its release, the song drew criticism directly from politicians running for the council seat in Ward 7 in Washington, D.C.

Background and development
Harvey wrote the songs for The Hope Six Demolition Project as well as her poetry book The Hollow of the Hand during her travels to Kosovo, Afghanistan and Washington D.C. with photographer/filmmaker Seamus Murphy between 2011 and 2014.

Recording
The album was created in sessions open to the public as part of an art installation at Somerset House in London called Recording in Progress. The sessions were forty-five minutes each in length and lasted for a month, beginning on 16 January 2015 and concluding on 14 February. Viewers could see Harvey create the album through one-way glass with producers Flood and John Parish, both of whom had worked on Harvey's previous album Let England Shake.

Mobile phones and devices with recording capabilities were confiscated before entering and viewers were led to a basement-level room. During the first viewing, she was working on a song called "Near the Memorials to Vietnam and Lincoln", which is featured on the album. Harvey was reportedly playing violin, harmonica and hurdy-gurdy. It was also reported that she was joined by musicians Terry Edwards and James Johnston and that Seamus Murphy was filming the entire session.

Release
Both of the album's singles were premiered on BBC Radio 6 Music, each on the day before its release. "The Wheel" was premiered on Steve Lamacq's show on 21 January 2016. Lamacq also revealed the album's release date to be 15 April 2016. "The Community of Hope" was premiered on Shaun Keaveny's show on 10 March 2016. "The Orange Monkey" was released as the album's third single on 7 April 2016.

The music video for "The Wheel" was released on 1 February 2016, and that for "The Community of Hope" on 18 March 2016. Both videos were directed by Seamus Murphy.

Critical reception

The Hope Six Demolition Project received generally positive reviews from critics. At Metacritic, which assigns a normalized rating out of 100 to reviews from mainstream publications, the album received an average score of 79, based on 34 reviews.

Greg Kot of the Chicago Tribune praised the album, writing that it "builds masterfully to a powerful, closing one-two punch". Vice journalist Robert Christgau was more reserved in his praise, briefly describing the record as "politics according to Polly, meaning keen observation, analytic detachment, and paradoxically forgiving melodies scarred again and again by baked-in pessimism and misanthropy". The album was named Mojos ninth-best album of 2016 and Uncuts sixth-best album of 2016.

Other responses
Upon its release, the opening track and second single, "The Community of Hope", drew criticism directly from politicians running for the council seat in Ward 7 in Washington, D.C., with former DC Mayor Vincent C. Gray saying "I will not dignify this inane composition with a response", and his campaign treasurer Chuck Thies insulting Harvey with "PJ Harvey is to music what Piers Morgan is to cable news." Grant Thompson, a pastor and former Congressional staffer running for the Ward 7 council seat, stated that Harvey "needs to see more of the city".

At times, The Hope Six Demolition Projects lyrical content was criticized for being political without literally proposing government policy. Laura Snapes of Pitchfork asked, "By pointing out the problems in these three communities, but proposing no solutions, is she (Harvey) just as responsible for their desertion as the global powers that came before her?"

Accolades

Commercial performance
The album debuted at number one on the UK Albums Chart. It sold 11,436 copies and became PJ Harvey's first number-one album in the United Kingdom. In its second week, the album sold 3,372 copies and fell twenty-two places to number twenty-three. It registered the third-largest drop in chart history for a number one album; Christina Aguilera's Bionic (2010) had fallen twenty-eight places and The Vamps's Night & Days had fallen thirty-four places.

Track listing

Non-album tracks

Personnel

Musicians
PJ Harvey – vocals , guitar , tenor saxophone , alto saxophone , violin , bass harmonica & auto harp , hand claps , piano & shaker  
John Parish – backing vocals , guitar , percussion , keyboards , variophon , accordion , mellotron vibes , baritone guitar & synth bass , autoharp , hand claps , piano & synthesizer , bass , drums  
Flood – production, backing vocals , synth bass , Sonic Maverick  
Mick Harvey – backing vocals , percussion , Taurus pedals , slide guitar , keyboards , bass , guitar & hand claps  
Jean-Marc Butty – backing vocals , percussion 

Guest musicians
Linton Kwesi Johnson – vocals  
Terry Edwards – backing vocals , percussion , baritone saxophone , keyboards , guitar, flute & bass harmonica , saxophones , melodica , guitar 
Mike Smith – backing vocals , baritone saxophone , piano , keyboards , saxophones , percussion , hand claps  
James Johnston – backing vocals , keyboards , violin , guitar , organ  
Alain Johannes – backing vocals , guitar , saxophone , keyboards , percussion , hand claps  
Kenrick Rowe – backing vocals , percussion , hand claps  
Enrico Gabrielli – backing vocals , percussion , bass clarinet , swanee whistle , basset clarinet  
Alessandro Stefana – backing vocals , guitars  
Adam 'Cecil' Bartlett – backing vocals , bass  
Ramy Essam – vocals & acoustic guitar

Production
Flood – producer, mixing
John Parish – producer
Drew Smith – mixing
Rob Kirwan – recording, engineering
Adam 'Cecil' Bartlett – additional engineering, mix engineering
Caesar Edmunds – mix engineering

Design
Michelle Henning – artwork, art direction
Rob Crane – layout, design
Seamus Murphy – photography

Charts

Weekly charts

Year-end charts

References

2016 albums
PJ Harvey albums
Albums produced by Flood (producer)
Island Records albums
Vagrant Records albums
Albums produced by John Parish
Concept albums